Maman (1999) is a bronze, stainless steel, and marble sculpture by the artist Louise Bourgeois. The sculpture, which depicts a spider, is among the world's largest, measuring over 30 ft high and over 33 ft wide (927 x 891 x 1024 cm). It includes a sac containing 32 marble eggs and its abdomen and thorax are made of ribbed bronze.

The title is the familiar French word for Mother (akin to Mummy). The sculpture was created in 1999 by Bourgeois as a part of her inaugural commission of The Unilever Series (2000), in the Turbine Hall at London's Tate Modern. This original was created in steel, with an edition of six subsequent castings in bronze.

Bourgeois chose the Modern Art Foundry to cast the sculpture because of its reputation and work.

Philosophy and meaning

The sculpture picks up the theme of the arachnid that Bourgeois had first contemplated in a small ink and charcoal drawing in 1947, continuing with her 1996 sculpture Spider. It alludes to the strength of Bourgeois' mother, with metaphors of spinning, weaving, nurture and protection. Her mother, Josephine, was a woman who repaired tapestries in her father's textile restoration workshop in Paris. When Bourgeois was twenty-one, she lost her mother to an unknown illness. A few days after her mother's passing, in front of her father (who did not seem to take his daughter's despair seriously), Louise threw herself into the Bièvre River; he swam to her rescue.

Permanent locations

 Tate Modern, UK – The permanent acquisition of this sculpture in 2008 is considered one of the Tate Modern's historical moments. Maman was first exhibited in the turbine hall and later displayed outside the gallery in 2000. It was received with mixed reactions of amazement and amusement. The sculpture owned by the Tate Modern is the only one made from stainless steel.
 National Gallery of Canada, Ottawa, Canada – The National Gallery of Canada acquired the sculpture in 2005 for 3.2 million dollars. The price took around a third of the annual budget of the gallery.
 Guggenheim Museum Bilbao, Spain
 Mori Art Museum, Tokyo, Japan  – On display at the base of Mori Tower, outside the museum.
 Leeum, Samsung Museum of Art, South Korea
 Crystal Bridges Museum of American Art, Bentonville, Arkansas, USA
 Qatar National Convention Center, Doha, Qatar

Temporary locations
Tours and featured exhibitions of Maman include:

 2001: Rockefeller Center Plaza, New York 
 2001: City Hall, The Hague, The Netherlands
 2002: State Hermitage Museum, St. Petersburg, Russia 
 2003: Nytorv, Copenhagen, Denmark

 2006: Mariakerke, Ostend, Belgium

 2007: Wanås Castle, Sweden
 2008: Jardin des Tuileries, Paris, France
 2008: Centre Pompidou, Paris, France
 27 March 2007 – 2 March 2008: Institute of Contemporary Art, Boston, Massachusetts 
 18 October 2008 – 25 January 2009: Museo di Capodimonte, Naples, Italy 

 2011: Fundacion Proa, Buenos Aires, Argentina
 Museu de Arte Moderna  (MAM), São Paulo, Brasil, 2011
 Bundesplatz, Bern, Switzerland, 24 May 2011 – 7 June 2011 
 Bürkliplatz, Zürich, Switzerland, 10 June 2011 – 2 August 2011
 Place Neuve, Geneva, Switzerland, 3 August 2011 – 28 August 2011
 Beyeler Foundation, Riehen/Basel, Switzerland, 3 September 2011 – 8 January 2012
 Hamburger Kunsthalle, Hamburg, Germany, 23 January 2012 – 17 June 2012
 Qatar National Convention Centre, Qatar – The Maman sculpture; exhibited from 20 January – 1 June 2012, at the Qatar National Convention Centre as the centerpiece of the Conscious and Unconscious exhibition; the first solo exhibit of Bourgeois' work to be displayed in the Middle East. The exhibit was organised by the Qatar Museums Authority.
 Roppongi Hills, Tokyo, Japan, 2012 – 2013
 Qatar National Convention Centre, Ad-Dawhah, Qatar, February 2014
 Palacio de Bellas Artes, Mexico City, Mexico, 15 November 2013 – 2 March 2014
 Moderna Museet, Stockholm, Sweden, January 2015 – 17 May 2015
 Museum Voorlinden, The Hague, the Netherlands, until 17 May 2020
 Fundação de Serralves, Porto, Portugal, December 2020 - February 2021
 Stavros Niarchos Foundation Cultural Center, Athens, Greece, 30 March 2022 - 6 November 2022

See also
Cultural depictions of spiders
List of artworks by Louise Bourgeois
Spider (Bourgeois)
Featured in Denis Villeneuve's 2013 film, Enemy.

Gallery

References

External links

Maman spider sculpture debuts in Ottawa – CBC Archives (Broadcast: 10 May 2005)
 Video : "They climb it" – Vimeo
 Louise Bourgeois – Maman – National Gallery of Canada (videos)

Works by Louise Bourgeois
1999 sculptures
Spiders in art
Bronze sculptures in Canada
Bronze sculptures in Japan
Bronze sculptures in the United States
Stainless steel sculptures
Steel sculptures in the United Kingdom
Outdoor sculptures in Arkansas
Outdoor sculptures in Tokyo
Sculptures of the Tate galleries
Collection of the Crystal Bridges Museum of American Art
Colossal statues in the United States
Colossal statues in the United Kingdom